Joe Poplawski (born August 2, 1957) is a former professional Canadian football receiver who played for the Winnipeg Blue Bombers in the Canadian Football League (CFL) from 1978 to 1986.

Professional career
Poplawski was originally a territorial exemption his hometown team the Edmonton Eskimos and prior to the beginning of the 1978 season he was traded to the Bombers in exchange for their star receiver Tom Scott. With 75 receptions for 998 yards and 8 touchdowns, Poplawski won the CFL's Most Outstanding Rookie Award in 1978. That season he was also selected to the Western Conference and CFL all-star team as a wide receiver. Despite a short career Poplawski achieved many more accolades including twice winning the Most Outstanding Canadian awards in 1981 and 1986. He was also the runner-up for this award in 1980, 1984 and 1985. He was selected to the All-Star team five times, first as mentioned above and four more times as a slotback in 1981, 1984, 1985, and 1986.  Poplawski helped the Bombers win the 72nd Grey Cup in 1984 with five catches for 101 yards and a touchdown. At the age of 29, he ended career with 8,341 receiving yards on 549 receptions and with 48 touchdowns. In his final season, he temporarily filled in as the team's kicker, following an injury to Trevor Kennerd. Poplawski made 8 out of 10 field goals, totalling 233 yards, with his longest coming from 45 yards out.

Statistics

Post-playing career
After leaving football Poplawski pursued a career as a professional soccer player. Currently he heads up the Cavalier Drive branch of Ranger Insurance in Winnipeg, acquired in July 2014 by Arthur J. Gallagher Canada Limited. Poplawski also worked as an analyst for CJOB radio alongside play by play man Bob Irving.

In 2005, Poplawski was named one of the Blue Bombers 20 All-Time Greats and was elected into the Canadian Football Hall of Fame in 1998. Inducted into the Manitoba Sports Hall of Fame and Museum in 2004.

External links
Joe Poplawski biography at Manitoba Sports Hall of Fame and Museum

References

1957 births
Living people
Canadian people of Polish descent
Alberta Golden Bears football players
Canadian Football Hall of Fame inductees
Canadian Football League Most Outstanding Canadian Award winners
Canadian Football League Rookie of the Year Award winners
Canadian football wide receivers
Edmonton Elks players
Players of Canadian football from Alberta
Canadian football people from Edmonton
University of Alberta alumni
Winnipeg Blue Bombers players